Zilus is a genus of lady beetles in the family Coccinellidae.

Species of the United States
These five species belong to the genus Zilus:
 Zilus aterrimus (Horn, 1895)
 Zilus eleutherae (Casey, 1899)
 Zilus fulvipes (Mulsant, 1850)
 Zilus horni Gordon, 1985
 Zilus subtropicus (Casey, 1924)

References

Further reading

 

Coccinellidae
Coccinellidae genera
Articles created by Qbugbot